Al-Atheer Sport Club, is an Iraqi football team based in Baghdad, that plays in Iraq Division Three.

Managerial history
 Adel Khudhair

See also 
 2020–21 Iraq FA Cup

References

External links
 Al-Atheer SC on Goalzz.com

2006 establishments in Iraq
Association football clubs established in 2006
Football clubs in Baghdad